is a 2000 Japanese action film directed by Takashi Miike based on a novel by Hase Seishu.

Plot
The Brazilian-Japanese criminal Mario hijacks a helicopter and uses a machine gun to attack a prison bus and free his Chinese girlfriend Kei. They attempt to raise money by robbing a cockfight but end up robbing drugs bought by the yakuza Fushimi of the Okayama Group from a Chinese triad boss named Ko moments before. Fushimi's boss demands his finger but Fushimi kills him and takes over his position with the aid of his soldier Yamazaki.

Mario and Kei sell the drugs to a local Brazilian TV broadcaster, who attempts to sell the drugs back to Ko but is beaten then given a message that there is a million-yen reward for Mario and Kei. Mario and Kei fly to Okinawa and are about to stow aboard a boat bound for Tapei then escape to Australia with the aid of their fake passports, but Fushimi abducts Mario's former lover Lucia's blind foster daughter Carla, so Mario and Kei return to Tokyo.

Kei is captured on the street by Riku and brought to Ko, who has always been in love with her. Fushimi and Yamazaki arrive and Ko challenges Fushimi to a ping-pong match, then uses a hidden button to shoot a spinning blade at Fushimi, which Fushimi dodges as Yamazaki shoots and kills Ko. The two yakuza take Kei with them, but Mario arrives and rescues Carla from the Okayama Group's offices before killing Fushimi and rescuing Kei.

Mario and Kei attempt to sail to Taiwan but Carla catches them and shoots them dead with a rifle. A video montage during the credits reveals that Yamazaki and Riku become lovers.

Cast
Teah as Mario
Michelle Reis as Kei
Patricia Manterola as Lucia
Mitsuhiro Oikawa as Ko
Koji Kikkawa as Fushimi
Ren Osugi
Akaji Maro
Anatoli Krasnov as Khodoloskii
Sebastian DeVicente as Rikardo
Terence Yin as Riku
Atsushi Okuno as Carlos
Akira Emoto as Kuwata
Eugene Nomura as Yamazaki
Marcio Rosario as Sanchez
Ryuushi Mizukami as Ide
Takeshi Nakajima
Tokitoshi Shiota as Beaten chicken owner

Other credits
Produced by:
Kazunari Hashiguchi - producer
Toshiki Kimura - producer
Yasuyoshi Tokuma - executive producer
Tsutomu Tsuchikawa - planner: Daiei
Hiroshi Yamamoto - producer
Casting: Donna Brower
Production Design: Akira Ishige
Art Direction: Reiko Kobayashi
Assistant Director: Masato Tanno
US set decorator: Isabelle Stamper
Sound Department: Kenji Shibazaki - sound

Reception
In a positive review of the film, Jesper Sharp of Midnight Eye wrote, "Colourful and exotic or cluttered and chaotic, even if the whole never quite manages to add up to the sum of its parts and lacks the weight of some of his earlier work, Takashi Miike on cruise-control is still a devastating force."

References

External links
 
 
 

2000 films
2000 action films
2000 crime thriller films
Films about child abduction in Japan
Films based on Japanese novels
Films directed by Takashi Miike
Films set in São Paulo
Films set in Okinawa Prefecture
Films set in Tokyo
Japanese crime action films
Japanese crime thriller films
2000s Japanese-language films
Cockfighting in film
Triad films
Yakuza films
2000s Japanese films
2000s Hong Kong films